Amos Yee Pang Sang (born 31 October 1998), also known as just Amos Yee, is a Singaporean convicted sex offender and former blogger, YouTuber and child actor. Yee is currently serving six years' imprisonment in the United States for sexual offenses including child pornography and grooming charges.

In late March 2015, shortly after the death of the first Prime Minister of Singapore, Lee Kuan Yew, Yee uploaded a video on YouTube criticizing Lee. In the video, Yee compared Lee to Jesus, and cast both in what was considered an obscene and disrespectful light. Yee also uploaded to his blog an image depicting Lee and Margaret Thatcher engaged in anal sex. A subsequent 32 police reports resulted in Yee being arrested in Singapore and charged with "intention of wounding the religious feelings of Christians", obscenity, and "threatening, abusive or insulting communication."

Yee's trial drew significant public interest and the court found him guilty in May 2015, meting a jail sentence of four weeks which was backdated to include 53 days served in remand, freeing Yee immediately following the trial. Yee appealed against both the court conviction and sentence. Yee's imprisonment drew criticism from human rights organisations, including Amnesty International, which considered Yee to be a "prisoner of conscience".

In August 2016, Yee was arrested for the second time and stood trial over six charges for deliberate intent to wound religious feelings and two charges for failure to turn up for police interviews. In September 2016, Yee was sentenced to 6 weeks' jail and fined $2000 for wounding religious feelings, which is under Section 298 of the Penal Code. The presiding judge said that Yee's actions could "generate social unrest" and should not be condoned. Yee began serving his jail term on 13 October 2016.

′In December 2016, Yee fled to the United States just before his call-up for National Service, immediately seeking political asylum. It was granted in March 2017 by the Chicago immigration court, despite being opposed by the U.S. federal government, which appealed the decision, causing Yee to be held in detention by Immigration and Customs Enforcement during the appeal process. Following an immigration appeals court's decision to uphold his bid for asylum, Yee was released in September 2017.

In November 2017, Yee received death threats for allegedly supporting pedophilia in videos and blog posts. In May 2018, Yee's channel was removed by YouTube for violating community guidelines and Twitter suspended his account. In July 2018, Yee's Patreon account was shut down. As of December 2018, Yee's WordPress blog, personal Facebook page, were shut down. In October 2020, Yee was arrested in Illinois on charges of solicitation and possession of child pornography; he eventually pled guilty to two charges of child grooming and child pornography in exchange for a sentence of six years in prison, which he began serving in December 2021.

Childhood and personal life 
Amos Yee Pang Sang was born on 31 October 1998, in Singapore. Yee was raised in Singapore and studied at Pei Chun Public School, where he took his Primary School Leaving Examination, and then attended Zhonghua Secondary School.

Yee, who was raised Catholic, and began attending Mass independently of his family, considered himself a practicing Catholic, but in 2013 he was reportedly "kicked out" of service as an altar boy after swearing during a meeting. After meeting with a priest to question his confirmation, and studying skeptical websites and videos, he became an atheist.

Acting career and early YouTube videos 
In March 2011, Yee won awards for Best Short Film and Best Actor at The New Paper'''s First Film Fest (FFF) for his film Jan. The New Paper described Yee as having taken on four different acting roles in his "self-written, self-directed film", which was described as a "twisted dark comedy" in which a boy tries to persuade his three friends to help a cancer-stricken girl. Yee, thirteen at the time, was described as having made the film "in his bedroom". The FFF awarded Yee a video camera and video editing software.

Following the success of Jan, FFF chief judge Jack Neo offered an internship to Yee, and additionally invited Yee to audition for Neo's film, We Not Naughty, a film about juvenile delinquency. Neo cast Yee in a minor acting role after Yee improvised and improved the language in a script given to him. Yee played a "smart younger brother" to a lead actor's character, and was allowed by Neo to write his own dialogue. Neo said that while Yee only had three scenes in the movie, they were "crucial," and praised Yee as a "natural comedian" with a passion for film-making. Neo defended Yee against accusations of arrogance, saying "just because [Yee] acts arrogant doesn't mean he is ... He is an actor, he's playing a role" but also suggested that Yee needed to learn humility.

In January 2012, Yee was widely criticized by netizens for uploading a video to YouTube which – according to My Paper – "called the Chinese New Year a rip-off of the Western New Year's Day". Garnering over 150,000 views, Yee later clarified that the video was satirical in nature. The New Paper described Yee as "mocking the origins of the zodiac and joking about how children should be given a one-month holiday for Chinese New Year" in the video. Within the video, Yee had also said that it was his "fake representation" of Chinese New Year.

According to The New York Times, prior to his 2015 Lee Kuan Yew video, Yee had uploaded "more than a dozen comedic riffs ... on subjects including Singapore's legal ban on homosexuality, The Hunger Games, Valentine's Day, Boyhood and the decision to drop out of school 'to pursue my "career" as a 17-year-old boy ranting in front of a video camera'." Nathan Heller of The New Yorker also noted in 2015 that Yee had been publishing homemade videos  which were "directed equally toward the Singaporean youth and a more international, American-style audience".

Video criticizing Lee Kuan Yew, arrest and conviction

On 23 March 2015, Lee Kuan Yew, the first Prime Minister of Singapore, died of severe pneumonia in hospital. Five days later, Yee uploaded a nearly nine-minute long video to YouTube titled Lee Kuan Yew is Finally Dead! In the expletive-laden video, Yee likened Lee to Jesus, saying that both were "power-hungry and malicious but deceive others into thinking they are both compassionate and kind. Their impact and legacy will ultimately not last as more and more people find out that they are full of bull". Yee went on to describe Lee's followers as "completely delusional and ignorant" with "absolutely no sound logic or knowledge about him that is grounded in reality", while accusing Christians of a similar lack of knowledge of the Bible's teachings. Apart from conveying his hope that the late Lee would not rest in peace, Yee also said that Lee was a "horrible person", an "awful leader" and "a dictator but managed to fool most of the world to think he was democratic". Lastly, Yee issued a challenge to Lee's son, Lee Hsien Loong, stating that if the younger Lee, the current Prime Minister, wished to sue him, Yee would "oblige to dance with him". The 2015 video has since been viewed more than 1 million times.

Before uploading the video, Yee said that he was "slightly apprehensive" that what he was doing might be illegal, and told two friends about it. He also looked up the Sedition Act, and told his mother he was making a video criticizing Lee without going into detail about the video's content. She advised him against uploading it but he went ahead anyway. Yee said that his ideas were influenced by meet-ups with members from the Singapore Democratic Party (SDP). Yee was also introduced to Roy Ngerng's blog by an SDP member, and Yee said he was convinced by what Ngerng had published.

Initial reactionThe Straits Times reported that Yee "was largely slammed by netizens over the video, although some defended his right to his opinion", while BBC News reported that the video drew a "visceral response from Singaporeans". The 2015 video resulted in several violent and threatening remarks being made against Yee online, including rape threats, which led to calls by the Media Literacy Council and the Singapore Kindness Movement urging netizens to act responsibly and civilly, even when facing views they find offensive.

Singaporean actors Gurmit Singh and Quan Yi Fong, who both have teenage children, weighed in on the issue. Singh placed the blame on Yee's parents, saying that "parents are supposed to be there to guide the child", while Quan said that in this case, Yee's "parents should have brought him to see a doctor". Today published a piece by Edwin Teong, who felt that Yee's video was one of several "recent cases" involving Singaporean youth which "reflect the recklessness and the lack of self-awareness that can lead to youths making mistakes, which burden not only themselves but also their families". Mikha Chan of Free Malaysia Today characterised Yee as a "wannabe intellectual" and "an opinionated person who talks loud and way too long on the same subject, often sensationalising the subject matter" regarding his video. Grace Fu, Singapore's second minister for foreign affairs, said that "it's not just any YouTube video; I think it was a YouTube video that crossed the red line on religion". Singapore's Prime Minister Lee Hsien Loong, in an interview with Time, said that the "governing authorities are open to criticism", but that the "ability to exercise the freedom of expression comes with limits".

Arrest
Thirty-two police reports were made against Yee's uploading of the 2015 video, while another police report was made against alleged obscene material on Yee's blog, where Yee had displayed and claimed credit for making a caricature "of Lee Kuan Yew engaging in anal sex with former British Prime Minister Margaret Thatcher". The Straits Times reported that Yee's mother had filed a police report against her son because she was unable to control his behaviour. Yee's mother, Mary Toh, later told The Online Citizen that she had filed a police report on 29 March, "not ... to have my son arrested", but in response to Yee publishing a vulgar image online despite her objections, leading her to fear for his safety. As she assumed that police action would soon be taken against her son, she filed a report in which she apologised to the nation for her son's actions and requested counselling for Yee. This was later reported by Today, which added that on 5 May Yee's mother told the police that she no longer wanted to provide a statement.

Yee was arrested on 29 March, on the grounds of "deliberate intention of wounding the religious or racial feelings", "threatening, abusive or insulting communication" and obscenity. His arrest drew international media attention. BBC News reported that "Yee was one of several people who went online to publicly criticise Mr Lee's legacy – others include human rights activists and a prominent poet – but he is the only one to have been arrested". The Guardian wrote that "For some, the lodging of police reports and subsequent arrest of Yee is a sign that the suppression of free speech during Lee's time in power has continued as a part of governance in Singapore." Nathan Heller of The New Yorker wrote that "Yee's arrest doesn't just underscore his complaints about Singapore's backwardness on rights and freedom. It shows the country's dire need for cultural education through intelligent dissent." Ben Mathis-Lilley of Slate said that "details of the situation are ridiculous ... If you watch the YouTube video, it becomes clear that Amos Yee is probably not an armed insurrectionist", while further labelling the Singaporeans who reported Yee to the police as "narcs".

The Committee to Protect Journalists organisation, and a petition started by a Christian Singaporean, both called for Yee's release. On the other hand, Abdul Rani Kulup Abdullah, chief of the Martabat Jalinan Muhibbah Malaysia organisation, praised the arrest of Yee, and encouraged Malaysia to follow Singapore's example of implementing strict laws on free speech to prevent "irresponsible statements" or "criticism [against the government which] may not be true but people can get influenced" leading to "anarchy".

 Charging and remand 
On 31 March, three charges were read out to Yee in the State Courts of Singapore, two of which were related to the 2015 video. The first charge was that Yee's 2015 video violated Section 298 of the Penal Code, Chapter 224, as it "contained remarks against Christianity, with the deliberate intention of wounding the religious feelings of Christians in general". The second charge was under Section 4 of the Protection from Harassment Act (later withdrawn) was that Yee's 2015 video violated the Protection from Harassment Act 2014 as it "contained remarks about Mr Lee Kuan Yew which was intended to be heard and seen by persons likely to be distressed". The third charge was that Yee had violated Section 292 of the Penal Code, by uploading an obscene image of Lee and Thatcher on 28 March 2015. BBC News reported that "Singapore's hate speech laws are intended to ensure harmony between its multi-ethnic population and prevent a recurrence of the racial violence of its early years."

Yee was initially released on bail set at 20,000 Singapore dollars on 31 March 2015 on the condition that he not comment or distribute any content online while the case was still ongoing. Meanwhile, Yee's father, whom Yee describes as being physically abusive, addressed Prime Minister Lee Hsien Loong, saying that he was "very sorry". On 3 April, Yee's mother brought him to the Institute of Mental Health (IMH) to see a psychiatrist to understand why he seemed "too daring" and feared nothing, but Yee quit after two sessions. Today reported that this was because Amos refused to continue the sessions at IMH, but this was contradicted by former bailor Vincent Law, who later told The Online Citizen that Yee could not attend the third IMH session because it had clashed with the day of his bail review hearing, and that Yee had unsuccessfully asked the institute to bring the session forward.

On 14 April, Yee flouted his initial bail conditions by asking for public donations to fund his legal fees on both on his blog and Facebook page; the blog post also linked to his controversial 2015 video and image. At 17 April pre-trial conference, Yee's police bail was converted to court bail of the same amount, while anyone, and not just his parents, was now allowed to post bail. Yee was taken into remand in Changi Prison for the duration of 17 to 21 April 2015 because no one in that time period posted bail, despite the bail amount only needing to be pledged instead of being physically deposited. On 21 April, Yee was bailed out by 51-year-old Vincent Law, a family and youth counsellor and a Christian parent, despite Law having never met Yee before. Three lawyers, Alfred Dodwell, Chong Jia Hao and Ervin Tan, also volunteered to represent him pro bono.

On 29 April, Yee breached his bail conditions on not uploading content online again by making two blog posts; the first questioned "the ridiculous terms of [his] bail", which Yee said "has absolutely nothing to do with my presence in court". In the second, he accused his father of being "abusive" and violent. On 30 April, the charge concerning remarks against Lee Kuan Yew was stood down. This means that the charge, instead of being dropped, would be dealt with at a later time, after the previous two charges are addressed. Yee also refused to take down the two blog posts despite being asked to by the District Judge Kessler Soh, as he felt that taking down the posts in question was tantamount to an admission of guilt. Concurrently, the bail amount was raised to $30,000. Meanwhile, Law applied to discharge himself as Yee's bailor. It remains to be decided whether Law will have to forfeit the previous $20,000 posted. Yee was again taken into remand because of a lack of anyone posting bail. Law later told The Online Citizen that while he wanted to post bail for Yee again, Yee rejected Law's offer as he did not want himself to be gagged, leading to Law discharging himself. Law also said that he did not regret acting as Yee's bailor, and that from talking to Yee, he had found him to be childlike and lacking in empathy.

On 6 May, Yee's lawyers appealed for a change in bail amount and bail conditions, arguing that accessing social media was "like drinking water" to Yee, and that the ban on Yee posting online content was "too broad and disproportionate". The prosecution was willing to lower the bail amount and release Yee from having to report daily to a police station if Yee went for psychiatric counselling, but Yee refused. Consequently, the High Court judge Tay Yong Kwang decided to maintain Yee's bail conditions.

 Slapping incident 
On 30 April 2015, while en route to the state courts for a pre-trial conference, Yee was slapped in the face by 49-year-old Neo Gim Huah who ran away after challenging Yee to sue him. Neo was arrested at 2 am the next day, less than 12 hours after the attack. Neo admitted that he committed the assault as he had taken offence at portions of Yee's video, which he felt were disrespectful to Lee Kuan Yew. He said that he closely monitored the case and had the intention to confront and slap Yee before his first two court appearances as he felt that Yee's actions had put Singapore in a negative light. Neo believed that it would be difficult for the criminal justice system to deal effectively with Yee because of Yee's age, and hence decided to "instill fear" in Yee. Neo admitted that he wanted the assault to be publicised "so that the world at large would know that the victim was being taught a lesson", and so he committed the assault in the presence of the media.

Neo's attack on Yee was condemned by Minister for Law K. Shanmugam and human rights non-governmental organisation Maruah as ill-befitting of a civilised society. The Singapore Democratic Party commented that "name-calling and personal destruction" was not the answer to legal procedures. 
Neo, who said he "lost control" and wanted to "teach Yee a lesson", has since apologised in his statement to Yee and his parents for the assault. Nevertheless, on 11 May Neo was sentenced by District Judge Ronald Gwee to three weeks in jail for voluntarily causing hurt. The prosecution had asked for two weeks' imprisonment.

 Trial 
Yee was tried as an adult on 7–8 May 2015, with Yee pleading not guilty to both charges. The timeline was pushed for by Yee's lawyers so that Yee would not "spend more time in remand than necessary". The case has attracted much public interest, with more than 20 people seen outside Court 7 more than an hour before the hearing was supposed to start. When Yee was led into the courtroom in handcuffs and leg shackles, several members of the public who were present waved at him, and he smiled at them. Amongst those who attended the trial were both of Yee's parents, Yee's former bailor, Vincent Law, blogger Roy Ngerng, as well as social activists Andrew Loh and Teo Soh Lung. Law, who said he never changed his mind about bailing him out, said that he came to support Yee and hopes he gets a good trial. The prosecution comprises DPPs Hay Hung Chun, Hon Yi and Kelvin Kow. The Defence comprises Alfred Dodwell and Chong Jia Hao from Dodwell & Co LLC and Ervin Tan from Michael Hwang Chambers LLC. The proceedings were presided over by District Judge Jasvendar Kaur.

The proceedings began with arguments from the defence regarding the obscenity charge. They argued that the legal test to determine whether or not an image is obscene is whether "it has an effect which is to tend to deprave and corrupt" any person who is exposed to it, and that the prosecution has not provided any evidence that the image passes the test. They argued that Section 292, under which Amos Yee is being charged, "is targeted at peddlers and purveyors of pornography" and that it is "wholly inapt to describe the mischief (if any) in this case". The prosecution had argued that Yee's own comments showed his intention to "corrupt and deprave", but the defence countered that a person cannot be convicted ipse dixit. They also argued that the image was "not a pornographic image, designed to arouse".

In court documents, Yee explained that his intention in critiquing both Christianity and Lee Kuan Yew was to open discussions on what he saw as "problems" with the faith and Singapore. He said that he was aware his critique would lead some people to take offence, but argued that this promoted discussion that "was healthy for positive change to take place in future." Yee also explained that while he "was aware that critiquing these problems (with the Christian faith) would promote ill-will", he saw this as "a natural consequence", and that "promoting ill-will is a prerogative for positive change to happen in society, especially if the issue at hand were initially controversial." In the hearing, Yee's defence lawyers Ervin Tan sought to challenge the understanding of the word "obscene" in relation to the charge against Yee for circulating obscene imagery. Another of his lawyers Alfred Dodwell was allowed to admit one more exhibit that he said would "vindicate his client". While the prosecution initially challenged this, the judge allowed its submission, to applause from members of the public in court. Amongst the court documents was the revelation that Yee knew that the contents of his blogs and videos would be offensive, but went ahead with posting them. Yee had said that he was "aware that the content of the video was offensive and would promote feelings of disharmony and ill-will within the Christian community".

Yee's trial drew international attention. The Wall Street Journal wrote that Yee's trial showcases "Singapore's struggle to adapt its tradition of censorship to the realities of the digital era."

 Verdict 

The court found Yee guilty and convicted him of both charges on 12 May 2015. With regards to the obscenity charge, judge Jasvender Kaur said that "standards of obscenity will change from time to time", and differ among countries, and that "it was up to the courts to decide based on community standards." Kaur considered the effect that image had on teenagers, and concluded that it met the "strongest possible disapproval and condemnation". With regards to the second charge on making remarks intending to hurt the feelings of Christians, Kaur said that Yee's remarks were "clearly derogatory and offensive to Christians".

Yee's bail was reduced to $10,000, and his parents paid the bail. The prohibition for him to post online was lifted. Yee was required to remove the offensive YouTube video and the blog post in question; it is not an offence, however, for other people to re-post Yee's videos or blog post. Yee complied, but 9 days later, on 21 May Yee made public both the blog post and video again.

Yee was greeted by "around a dozen onlookers who waited to welcome him and give him advice." To reporters, Yee said that he "[did] not know if [he] should celebrate [his] release or mourn [his] sentence." Yee was given a red packet containing a $100 note by retired artist Koh Ban Jee, who said "he wanted to encourage Yee to go back to school and go to university." A day before the verdict, dozens showed up for a candlelight vigil at Hong Lim Park to support Yee.

During the court hearing, Yee, who faced a fine and up to three years jail, had requested to be jailed instead of going for probation after being found guilty by Kaur. The prosecution requested that Yee be given counseling and probation. The court adjourned sentencing pending a probation report for Yee.

The verdict attracted international attention. International rights group Human Rights Watch (HRW) criticised the verdict as "publicly punishing a youthful dissident who dared besmirch the image of the recently passed leader, and intimidating anyone else who might think of doing the same in the future." Phil Robertson, HRW's deputy director for Asia, said that "Singapore's actions to criminalise Yee's statements run contrary to international human rights standards and are a dangerous affront to freedom of expression." Phil Robertson, the Bangkok-based deputy director of Human Rights Watch's Asia division, said that "criminalizing free expression by anyone who dares mock the powers that be is a tried and true practice of the Singapore government, and Amos Yee is the latest victim." The Globe and Mail writes that Yee's case highlights why "support for Asia's atheists is hard to come".
Amnesty International criticised the verdict and declared Yee a prisoner of conscience, citing Article 19 of the Universal Declaration of Human Rights that enshrines the principle to freedom of expression.

 Molestation allegations 
On 13 May 2015, a day after being released, Yee took to Facebook alleging that he had been molested by his ex-bailor Law. Law said the allegation was "false". Yee invited the media to "catch" him at an MRT station, but he did not show up. Yee later revealed that his allegations were part of a ploy to "manipulate the press to indulge in the thoroughly exhausting experience of waiting in Pasir Panjang fruitlessly for several hours". Yee also revealed that Law "didn't really molest" him, but maintained that Law was "creepy". In response to the allegations, Law told The Online Citizen (TOC) that "he found Yee's clarification to be insincere and that it does not fully absolve him from the allegation of molest", said that he would "take legal action" for defamation if Yee does not apologise publicly and fully retract the allegation.

In response to the ultimatum, Yee, who described his own actions as "horrid", wrote that he was "extremely remorseful for the turmoil" that he had caused to Law and his family. Yee also wrote that he was "currently tendering a long, and detailed public apology to Vincent and his family". He asked Law to give him "about 3 days" to finish preparing it, as he was a "slow writer". In response to Yee's apology, Law decided that he would not pursue the matter any further.

After Law decided not to pursue the matter, Yee retracted his apology, revealed that he had "lied" yet again and "made fun" of Law. In a 6000-word expose, Yee detailed how Law "violated him emotionally". He also highlighted that "molest" also means "disturb" and that his accusation of Law would be accurate if one used this definition instead, and hence concluded that he was "technically molested" by Law. 
Yee stated that "it was stupid of people to believe that he would actually issue a sincere apology". He attributes this "inherent stupidity" to "the mindset inherent in that of religion". He then proceeded to call Law a "molester", a "mentally unsound person" and a "hypocrite". Yee also described his interactions with Law and explained how he plotted to publicly humiliate Law while he was in remand prison. When asked about Yee's latest about-turn, Law replied that he thought "it's best to leave Amos alone and not write about him." He added that he was not considering legal action. Law's son, Francis Micah Law, took to Facebook to refute Yee's claims against his father. In it, he stated that his father always "painted a positive portrayal of Amos in hopes that he would improve the public opinion of Amos."

Yee's accusations against Law caused anger among social media users. Vivekanandan of Free Malaysia Today writes that Yee's Facebook post was "derisive", "acerbic", and "sarcastic". It also charged that with his Facebook post, Yee was guilty of "mocking Christianity again". Carlton Tan of Asian Correspondent expressed his sadness that Yee had gone down this road, and said that he "[does] not support [Yee's] contempt towards the fundamental dignity of other persons."

 Sentencing 
On 27 May 2015, Yee was called back to court for an urgent hearing as he refused to meet with his assigned probation officer. The prosecution called for a report to assess Yee's suitability for reformative training, arguing that a jail term or a fine would have no rehabilitative effect. On 2 June, Yee was remanded for three weeks and a report was made to assess whether Yee was suitable to serve reformative training. For this remand period, no bail option was offered. This decision came after Yee rejected the option of probation and instead pleaded for a jail term. The prosecution has argued that Yee's re-uploading of the image and video pertaining to his charges should be taken into account as an indication of his conduct and character.

During Yee's remand, new posts emerged on Yee's Facebook page. Amongst them were comparisons of Yee to "figures of martyrdom such as Gandi and Nelson Mandela, as well as complaints about life in prison. One post lamented the lack of exposure to sunshine, while others criticise the attitudes of police officers, such as towards Yee's opting for vegetarian meals. The posts intrigued the media and public since the Singapore Prison Service has confirmed that all inmates and remandees do not have access to any telecommunication devices within the prison. In response, one of Yee's lawyers, Chong, said that they weren't aware of how this is happening and didn't "want to speculate."

Remand
On 23 June 2015, district judge Kaur ordered that Yee be remanded at the Institute of Mental Health for two weeks in response to a report by Dr Munidasa Winslow who said that Yee may have autism spectrum disorder. A psychiatrist concluded that Yee does not suffer from any mental disorder, and would benefit from having a counsellor or mentor guide him in using the Internet.

Sentence criticism
Yee's sentence was met with criticism from the United Nations Human Rights Office which called for the immediate release of Yee in line with its commitment under the UN Convention on the Rights of Child.

Yee's sentence was also met with criticism from the Humans Rights Watch, which said that "nothing that Amos Yee said or posted should ever have been considered criminal – much less merit incarceration". Singaporean politician Goh Meng Seng said that even though he did not like Amos "because he's rude in the Singapore context", he felt that "he [had] to defend his rights." Singaporean academic Cherian George, lawyer Peter Low, a former president of the Law Society of Singapore, as well as leading rights activists, academics, filmmakers and members of the arts community signed a letter saying that they were "troubled by the State's harsh reactions and that "sending Yee to the facility could deter young people in the city-state from expressing their views openly for fear of reprisals.

Hospitalisation
On 5 July 2015, night before Yee's next hearing was scheduled to be held, Yee was admitted to the Accident and Emergency department at Changi General Hospital for low blood glucose levels. According to his mother, Yee had not been eating for several days, was not sleeping well and feeling depressed. Earlier, on 12 June, Yee's lawyer reported that Yee had been experiencing suicidal thoughts at the prospect of reformative training. While Yee had been initially "very courteous and engaged in the process", his stint at the Institute for Mental Health had been "a shock to his system".

On 6 July, Yee was sentenced to four weeks in jail, one week for posting obscene materials and three weeks for wounding the religious feelings of Christian in his video calling Lee Kuan Yew a "horrible person", with the sentences to be served consecutively. He was addressed directly by the judge Kaur who said that she hopes that Yee would "rethink long and hard his decision not to continue with formal education," before acknowledging that there are few dropout success stories.

Yee was released immediately after his sentences were announced as they were backdated to 2 June when he was in remand (Yee was in remand for 50 days). Yee's demeanor when he was freed differed from his previous court appearances. Yee appeared pale and gaunt, wore a frown on his face and kept his head bowed most of the time. In court, Deputy Public Prosecutor Hay Hung Chun said that they saw Yee's actions as "no less than a significant repudiation of his previous posturing, and it is an important acknowledgment that he has finally accepted the gravity of what he had done and that he was or is willing now to make amends by undoing it." This was in response to Institute of Mental Health child psychiatrist Cai Yiming's report that Yee had admitted to his guilt and has "realised what he has done was against the law and could disrupt social harmony". As a result of the change which Hay describes as "seismic", Hay announced that the prosecution would be asking for just one day of imprisonment. Upon his release, Yee began to ask for cash donations.

Calling the four-week jail sentence a "dark day for freedom of expression" in Singapore, Amnesty International charges that the sentence violates the right to freedom of expression and should be quashed. Rupert Abbott, South East Asia and the Pacific Deputy Director said that "Amos Yee is not a criminal. He should never have been charged, let alone convicted. He has been punished solely for exercising his right to freedom of expression." He added that "if there is any justice Amos Yee would be walking free from court without a conviction against his name." The Online Citizen calls the conviction "wrong" and describes the sentence as "manifestly excessive". Writer and gender equality activist Jolene Tan accused the prosecution for "[focusing] overwhelmingly on Amos' attitudes rather than any harm that was done by his supposed crimes." She questioned the motive of the sentence, asking whether it was "justice for a crime", or "just as a way to quash Amos into docility." The Association of Women for Action and Research criticised the court decision and urged the state to be mindful of the "stigmatising effect of such prosecutions in the future".

 Protests against treatment of Yee 
Yee's sentence led to protests from several activist groups. On 27 June 2015, about sixty people under the banner of the Taiwan Association for Human Rights demonstrated outside the Singapore Trade Office in Taipei. The protesters from more than 10 civil society groups under the banner of the Taiwan Association for Human Rights (TAHR) held placards and chanted "Free Amos Yee" for about half an hour.

On 30 June, university students in Hong Kong held a protest to urge the Singapore government to release Yee. Student activist group Scholarism, which took part in the protest, published a post asserting that the actions taken against Yee "reflects the unreasonable oppression and the very limited acceptance of dynamic voices in the so-called 'modernised' society of Singapore."

On 5 July, a demonstration was held in Hong Kong, where protestors burnt effigies of Lee Hsien Loong and Lee Kuan Yew, to demand the release of Yee. About 50 people from various civic and political groups gathered with banners and placards near the Singapore Consulate in Admiralty district. They held banners and placards that read "Dissident is not Demented" and "Freedom of Speech should not be infringed".

Also on 5 July in Singapore, a rally organised by Community Action Network, a group of individuals describing themselves as "concerned about freedom of expression in Singapore", was attended by an estimated 500 people. The rally was held to demand the release of Yee. The organisers of the protest were "damning" in their condemnation of the state's handling of Yee's case. Jolovan Wham, a social worker and civil activist said that "[the activists] came together to protest what the government is doing to Amos Yee, and to take a stand on freedom of expression," citing "an unprecedented crackdown on freedom of expression in Singapore" in the last few years.

 Appeal against conviction and sentence 

Yee filed an appeal against the conviction and sentence, ahead of 20 July 2015 deadline for making an appeal. Yee's lawyer, Dodwell, said that "whether this was a crime or not still remains a question [that they wanted to] determine in the high court". Yee's mother said that she wanted "to know for sure that what Amos has done is not criminally wrong". For the hearing at the High Court, Yee's lawyers want the appeal to be heard by a non-Christian judge.

Criticism of Islam, second arrest and conviction

In his post on 27 November 2015, Amos addressed Calvin Cheng's comments on killing the children of terrorist members. He wrote, "Oh yes and xxxx Islam, and Allah doesn't exist, but say you see a prick from ISIS who wants to kill or has even killed before, don't think that's a scenario where it's alright to kill him." His statement prompted several police reports from the public, and subsequent police investigation in December 2015 for allegedly posting offensive material on his blog.

On 13 May 2016, it was reported in the Straits Times that Yee was arrested on 11 May for "allegedly uttering words last November with a deliberate intent to wound religious or racial feelings" and for "not showing up at a police station". He was subsequently bailed.

Trial
On 17 August 2016, Yee stood trial over six charges for deliberate intent to wound religious feelings and two charges for failure to turn up for police interviews. He was not represented by a lawyer. Seven police officers were summoned as prosecution's witnesses. Before the trial could proceed further, Yee was granted permission to go for Criminal Case Resolution process.

Sentencing
On 29 September 2016, Amos Yee was sentenced to 6 weeks' jail and fined $2000 for wounding religious feelings. The presiding judge, Ong Hian Sun, said that Yee had "deliberately elected to do harm" in a photograph and two videos he posted online that were said to have "offensive and insulting words and profane gestures to hurt the feelings of Christians and Muslims". Ong said that Yee's actions could "generate social unrest" and should not be condoned.

Yee began serving his jail term on 13 October 2016. During this time, a Singaporean activist based in the United States, Melissa Chen (formerly Chin) visited him and, by her own admission, handed him documents to facilitate his escape to the US.

 Asylum in the United States 
On 16 December 2016, Amos Yee fled to the United States where he was detained at Chicago's O'Hare Airport after announcing his intention to seek political asylum. During the application, he was incarcerated in McHenry County Jail in Illinois. He was subsequently transferred to Dodge County Detention Facility in Wisconsin. Yee was granted asylum in the US on 24 March 2017, after the judge ruled that Yee faced persecution in Singapore for his political opinions; the judge cited the different ways that Cheng and Yee were treated in his decision.

Yee was due to serve his national service upon reaching 18 years old in October 2016. By leaving Singapore, Yee breached a Singaporean law which mandates compulsory military service for all Singaporean men. Yee is considered as a defaulter by the authorities. Defaulting carries a prison sentence from two to 36 months long, depending on the length of the default period and a fine of not more than S$10,000.

On 25 April 2017, the U.S. government appealed against the decision to grant Yee asylum, so he continued to be held at the Immigration and Customs Enforcement (ICE) center during the appeal process. On his reasons for seeking U.S. asylum, Reuters reported that although Yee was highly critical of the U.S. government abroad, he has said that - "It is not going to the best country. This is about going to the country that most effectively promotes my political philosophy of anarchical communism and ending private property and wage labor".

Amos Yee was released from a U.S. Immigration and Customs Enforcement facility in downtown Chicago on 26 September 2017 following an immigration appeals court's decision to uphold his bid for asylum. A Board of Immigration Appeals decision upheld Chicago immigration judge Samuel Cole's March ruling that Yee had a "well-founded fear" of being persecuted upon return to Singapore. The judge said the aim of jailing Yee in Singapore at such a young age was to stifle his political speech. With asylum status, Yee will be eligible to apply for a green card in a year.

Yee told reporters after his release that he can now criticise the Singaporean government without fear of imprisonment, and that while he planned to make more critical videos on the topic, he might also broaden his work to US politics since he is in the country.

 Controversy over pro-pedophilia opinions 
In November 2017, Yee uploaded three videos to YouTube, entitled Why Pedophilia Is Alright, Don't Discriminate Pedophiles, and Free Speech for the Pedophile''. Yee had been previously invited to give a speech at Harvard College by The Open Campus Initiative, a student club, but his invitation was rescinded 24 hours before the event. Out of money, Yee asked for donations from his followers via Facebook, stating he would rather borrow than take a job he did not like. Shortly after his appeal for donations, he was banned from Facebook for 30 days for violating Facebook's community standards. Twitter also suspended his account.

In April 2018, the Toy Industry Association pulled ads from YouTube following a CNN report its ads had been appearing on Yee's channel, which was being used to promote pedophilia. YouTube subsequently pulled all ads from Yee's videos and banned him from monetizing content. In early May 2018, YouTube terminated Yee's channel for violating community guidelines. In July 2018, Yee's Patreon account was shut down.

In December 2018, Yee's Facebook and Twitter pages were shut down,  as well as his WordPress blog, where he had continued to express pro-pedophilia views.

In September 2019 after a 9-month internet hiatus, Yee stated in an interview that he had been busy creating pro-paedophile videos.

In August 2020, it was reported that Yee stated that he was diagnosed with narcissistic personality disorder while in an immigration jail in the United States. Yee also stated he was going to rebrand himself under the name "Polocle".

Incarceration on child pornography charges
In October 2020, Yee was arrested in Illinois on state charges of solicitation and possession of child pornography, after he allegedly exchanged nude photos and "thousands" of messages with a 14-year-old girl from Texas while he was living in Chicago via WhatsApp from February 1, 2019, to June 30, 2019. His bail was set at US$1 million and he was banned from internet usage while awaiting trial. After initially pleading not guilty to the charges in November 2020, Yee accepted a plea agreement in late 2021 where he pled guilty to two charges of child grooming and child pornography in exchange for a sentence of six years in prison, and having 16 other charges against him dropped. Yee was also warned that he may be deported back to Singapore and may be denied entry to the US in future, as well as potentially being denied naturalization as a U.S. citizen. The sentence was backdated to when he was arrested, with him projected to be released on 8 October 2026.

References

External links
 

1998 births
Anarchism in Singapore
Anarcho-communists
Asian child actors
Atheism activists
Child activists
Critics of Christianity
Critics of Islam
Former Roman Catholics
Free speech activists
Living people
Pedophile advocacy
Singaporean expatriates in the United States
Singaporean male film actors
Singaporean people convicted of child pornography offenses
Singaporean people of Chinese descent
Singaporean YouTubers
Singaporean atheists
Singaporean exiles
Youth activists
Commentary YouTubers
YouTube filmmakers
People with narcissistic personality disorder
YouTube controversies
People convicted of obscenity
People convicted of speech crimes
Singaporean criminals
People convicted of child pornography offenses
Prisoners and detainees of Illinois
Singaporean prisoners and detainees